Hidden Folks is a hidden object game developed by Adriaan de Jongh and Sylvain Tegroeg. In the game, players are presented with a series of animated, interactive scenes and must find hidden characters, objects, and animals. The game was released for iOS, Android, Linux, macOS, and Windows in February 2017.

Gameplay
Hidden Folks is a wimmelbilderbuch video game in which players are tasked with locating hidden characters, objects, and animals in a series of environments, similar to the British book series Where's Wally?. Each scene is animated and composed of monochrome art. The majority of objects in the environment can be interacted with by tapping or clicking on them.

Development and release
Hidden Folks was developed by Dutch indie video game designer Adriaan de Jongh and Dutch artist Sylvain Tegroeg. A prototype of the game was created by de Jongh after he saw detailed illustrations during at Tegroeg's graduate art show. The two began collaborating in 2014, when Tegroeg noticed and was impressed by how de Jongh had used his art. The idea of creating a hidden object game came naturally from Tegroeg's detailed art. All of the game's art was hand-drawn on paper, scanned in to create digital images on a computer, and then layered manually to form the scenes. The game was built using the Unity game engine, however de Jongh also built custom tools to specifically handle the process of digitising the hand-drawn art and maintaining detail on mobile devices. Hidden Folks was designed to be a casual and relaxing gaming experience. The game's audio is composed of noises made from the developers' mouths.

The game was announced in February 2016. It was released for iOS, Android (operating system), Linux, macOS, and Windows on 15 February 2017.

Reception

Polygon ranked the game 41st on their list of the 50 best games of 2017, while The Verge named it one of their 15 Best Games of 2017. It was also nominated for "Best Mobile Game" in IGN's Best of 2017 Awards.

Accolades

References

External links
 

2017 video games
Android (operating system) games
Hidden object games
IOS games
Linux games
MacOS games
Monochrome video games
Video games developed in the Netherlands
Windows games
Single-player video games
Nintendo Switch games
Indie video games